The Operational Research Society (ORS), also known as The OR Society, is an international learned society in the field of operational research (OR), with more than 3,100 members (2021). It has its headquarters in Birmingham, England.

History
The OR Society was created in April 1948 as the Operational Research Club, becoming the OR Society in 1953. It is the world's oldest-established learned society catering to the OR profession and one of the largest in the world, with members in 53 countries. A full history of the OR Society can be found on the OR Society website.

Founding members of the OR society included: Charles F. Goodeve, Patrick Blackett, and Charles Tizard.

Governance
The OR Society is registered charity number 313713 and also a company limited by guarantee (Company number 00663819). Its charitable objectives are:
the advancement of knowledge and interest in OR.
the advancement of education in OR.

The management of the society is overseen by a General Council, consisting of up to 36 members. Its affairs are managed by a board, consisting of five officers elected by the membership, including the President, the immediate Past President or the President Elect, two vice presidents, an Honorary Treasurer, and up to six members of the General Council.

The current president is Professor Edmund Burke. Previous presidents have included Sir Owen Wansbrough-Jones, Maurice Kendall, John Giffard, 3rd Earl of Halsbury, George Alfred Barnard, and K. D. Tocher.

Publications
The society publishes the Journal of the Operational Research Society, Knowledge Management Research and Practice, Journal of Simulation, European Journal of Information Systems, O.R. Insight, Health Systems, Journal of Business Analytics and Inside O.R. (a monthly news magazine). The society's publisher is Taylor & Francis.

Training courses
The OR Society organises a number of O.R. and Analytics based courses to allow O.R. professionals (and others) to gain appropriate skills for their careers. These courses cover O.R. methodology such as system dynamics, simulation, soft systems, web analytics, data-mining; other useful tools such as VBA and Excel; and consultancy skills. These are generally short courses, between one and two days.

Conferences
The OR Society organises several conferences each year to promote the use of O.R. and for attendees to exchange ideas. These conferences include:
The "O.R. Conference" held annually, usually lasting for 3 days and covers all aspects of O.R.
The “New To O.R. Conference” (formerly known as The "Young O.R. Conference") held every two years, giving those with 10 or less years experience of working in O.R. an opportunity to meet, present on and discuss different O.R. disciplines. The conference lasts for 3 days and covers all topics in O.R.
Several one- to two-day conferences in more specialist areas including, Simulation workshop(s), Knowledge Management Conferences, Intelligent Management Systems in Operations, and analytics.

Subgroups
The OR society has two sorts of subgroups: Regional Societies and Special Interest Groups.

Regional Societies
The OR Society has a number of regional societies which enable members to promote O.R. and allow them to build contacts with other operational researchers working in their (or related) area(s) and to expand their knowledge in O.R. The current regional societies include East Midlands, London & South East, Midland, North East, North West, Scotland, South Wales, Southern, Western, Yorkshire & Humberside. These regional societies organise meetings, works visits and other events.

Career Days
The OR Society organises an annual Career Day in November for employers to recruit graduates and those who are interested in work in O.R.

Interaction with other bodies
The OR Society works with a number of other bodies, to achieve common aims, including (amongst others):
 International Federation of Operational Research Societies, an umbrella organisation for 45 plus O.R. societies from different countries across the world.
 Association of European Operational Research Societies, (a regional grouping within the International Federation of Operational Research Societies (IFORS)).
 The Council for Mathematical Sciences. This council provides advice to government, education funding committees (such as ESPRC) on mathematical matters including education and policy, and brings together mathematicians with stakeholders in mathematics to explore issues and solutions. The council includes The O.R. Society, the Institute of Mathematics and its Applications, The Royal Statistical Society, The London Mathematical Society and the Edinburgh Mathematical Society.

Awards
To promote and disseminate O.R. knowledge and working practices the OR Society gives awards (medals, prizes and grants). These awards include (but are not limited to):
The Beale Medal - for sustained contribution to O.R.
The President’s Medal – for the best account of O.R. practice given at the Society’s annual conference
The PhD Prize - most distinguished body of research leading to the award of a doctorate in the field of O.R.
Scholarships to enable distinguished contributors to present their work at the IFORS Triennial Conference
Donald Hicks Scholarships for young researchers and practitioners
The May Hicks awards for student projects
The Simpson Award for young researchers and practitioners
The Lyn Thomas Impact Medal - awarded to the academic or research which best demonstrates novelty and real-world impact, backed up by evidence

See also 
 List of mathematical societies
 Council for the Mathematical Sciences

References

External links 
 
Catalogue of the ORS archives, held at the Modern Records Centre, University of Warwick

1948 establishments in the United Kingdom
Mathematical societies
Organisations based in Birmingham, West Midlands
Organizations established in 1948